The 1951 Star World Championship was held at Gibson Island, United States in 1951.

Results

References

Star World Championships
Star World Championship
Star World Championships in the United States
Star World Championship